Mount York Claystone is a narrow band of sedimentary rocks occurring in the Sydney Basin in eastern Australia. This stratum is up to 13 metres thick. Mount York Claystone consists of red brown claystones, of fine‐grained and coarsely oolitic, kaolinite clayrocks.

Often seen situated above the Burra-Moko Head Sandstone and below the Banks Wall Sandstone in the cliffs of the Blue Mountains. The line of strata appears as a vegetated horizontal strip.

Formed in the Triassic, it is part of the Narrabeen Group of sedimentary rocks and has similarities to the Garie Formation.

See also
 Sydney Basin
 Garie Formation
 Bulgo Sandstone
 Narrabeen group

References

Geologic formations of Australia
Triassic Australia
Shale formations
Geology of New South Wales